James Robert 'Bob' Gilbert (2 May 1923 – 23 July 1991) was an Australian rugby league footballer who played in the 1940s.

Gilbert was the youngest son of the legendary rugby league player Herb Gilbert and brother of Herb Gilbert Jr. and Jack Gilbert. After returning from active service in World War II, Bob Gilbert played 4 games with St. George Dragons during  1945. He continued in the lower grades at Saints until the late 1940s before retirement.

Gilbert died in Chifley, Australian Capital Territory on 23 July 1991.

References

1923 births
1991 deaths
St. George Dragons players
Australian rugby league players
Rugby league players from Sydney
Rugby league centres
Australian Army personnel of World War II
Australian Army soldiers